The Idea Factory: Bell Labs and the Great Age of American Innovation is a 2012 book by Jon Gertner that describes the history of Bell Labs, the research and development wing of AT&T, as well as many of its eccentric personalities, such as Claude Shannon and William Shockley. It is Gertner's first published book.

Reception
The New York Times said that Mr. Gertner's "portraits of Kelly and the cadre of talented scientists who worked at Bell Labs are animated by a journalistic ability to make their discoveries and inventions utterly comprehensible — indeed, thrilling — to the lay reader".

The Idea Factory was reviewed favorably by Foreign Policy, the New York Times, the Cleveland Plain-Dealer and others. Three adapted excerpts from the book were published in TIME.

Facebook co-founder and chief executive officer Mark Zuckerberg recommended The Idea Factory to his book club in 2015, saying of the choice, "[he is] very interested in what causes innovation — what kinds of people, questions and environments."

See also
Bell Labs
William Shockley
Claude Shannon

References

2012 non-fiction books
Bell Labs
Books about scientists
Penguin Press books